Coddle Creek is a stream/river that rises near Mooresville in Iredell County, North Carolina. It flows through most of northwestern Cabarrus County, North Carolina where it empties into Rocky River near Harrisburg, North Carolina.

References

Rivers of North Carolina
Rivers of Iredell County, North Carolina
Rivers of Cabarrus County, North Carolina
Tributaries of the Pee Dee River